East Brenham Historic District is residential area located northeast of downtown Brenham, Texas.

Comprising about nine city blocks, the district contains 79 contributing resources, primarily residential with a some commercial buildings and a church. The oldest building is an 1881 house, most of the buildings date from about 1875 to 1940.

The district was added to the National Register of Historic Places on March 29, 1990 as an example of a cohesive residential neighborhood from the late 19th to early 20th centuries.

Photo gallery

See also

National Register of Historic Places listings in Washington County, Texas
Recorded Texas Historic Landmarks in Washington County

References

External links

National Register of Historic Places in Washington County, Texas
Geography of Washington County, Texas
Buildings and structures in Brenham, Texas
Historic districts on the National Register of Historic Places in Texas